Jesse Spencer Bell (April 1, 1906 – March 19, 1967) was a United States circuit judge of the United States Court of Appeals for the Fourth Circuit.

Education and career
Born in Charlotte, North Carolina, Bell received a Bachelor of Arts degree from Duke University in 1927 and after studying at Harvard Law School received a Bachelor of Laws from the University of North Carolina School of Law in 1930. Bell was in private practice of law in Charlotte from 1930 to 1961. He served in the United States Army in field artillery, achieving the rank of major.

He was a member of the North Carolina Senate from 1957 to 1961. In the 1950s, he chaired the Committee on Improving and Expediting the Administration of Justice in North Carolina, also known as the Bell Commission. He was a delegate to the 1960 Democratic National Convention.

Federal judicial service
Bell was nominated by President John F. Kennedy on September 14, 1961, to the United States Court of Appeals for the Fourth Circuit, to a new seat created by 75 Stat. 80. Bell was confirmed by the United States Senate on September 23, 1961, and received his commission on September 27, 1961. His service was terminated on March 19, 1967, due to his death.

References

Sources

Jesse Spencer Bell Papers J. Murrey Atkins Library, UNC Charlotte
Jesse Spencer Bell Paper Atkins Library

1906 births
1967 deaths
Judges of the United States Court of Appeals for the Fourth Circuit
United States court of appeals judges appointed by John F. Kennedy
20th-century American judges
Democratic Party North Carolina state senators
Duke University alumni
Harvard Law School alumni
University of North Carolina School of Law alumni
United States Army officers
20th-century American politicians